The following highways are numbered 18F:

United States
 Nebraska Spur 18F
 New York State Route 18F
 New York State Route 18F (1934–1938) (former)

See also
List of highways numbered 18